The 1870 Massachusetts gubernatorial election was held on November 8.

Governor William Clafin was re-elected to a third consecutive one-year term, defeating Democrat John Quincy Adams II and abolitionist attorney Wendell Phillips, running on the Labor Reform ticket.

In the concurrent but separate election for Lieutenant Governor, Republican Joseph Tucker was also re-elected to a third term.

General election

Candidates
John Quincy Adams II, former State Representative from Quincy and nominee for Governor in 1868 and 1869
William Claflin, incumbent Governor since 1869 (Republican)
Wendell Phillips, abolitionist and activist (Labor Reform)

Results

See also
 1870 Massachusetts legislature

References

Governor
1870
Massachusetts
November 1870 events